Louise E. Williams Bishop (born June 27, 1933) was a Democratic member of the Pennsylvania House of Representatives, District 192.

Bishop has been heavily involved in radio broadcasting for many years and she was credited with keeping Philadelphia calm following the assassination of Martin Luther King Jr. in April 1968. She was inducted into the Broadcast Pioneers of Philadelphia Hall of Fame on November 22, 2013.

As "Lois Lane", Bishop released the single "Turn me loose" on Wand Records in 1964.

She resigned her seat on Dec 16, 2015 amid corruption allegations.

References

External links
Pennsylvania House of Representatives - Louise Bishop (Democrat) official PA House website
Broadcast Pioneers of Philadelphia web page

Living people
1933 births
Democratic Party members of the Pennsylvania House of Representatives
African-American state legislators in Pennsylvania
Women state legislators in Pennsylvania
African-American women in politics
21st-century American politicians
21st-century American women politicians
21st-century African-American women
21st-century African-American politicians
20th-century African-American people
20th-century African-American women
Pennsylvania politicians convicted of crimes
Pennsylvania politicians convicted of corruption